Gibberula aequatorialis is a species of sea snail, a marine gastropod mollusk, in the family Cystiscidae.

References

aequatorialis
Gastropods described in 1925
Cystiscidae